Telemark Research Institute is a Norwegian government-funded research institute, headquartered in Bø, Telemark. It was founded in 1986 and is one of nine regional research institutes in Norway which are funded by the Research Council of Norway. It is organised as a foundation. Its main focus areas are cultural studies, regional studies, innovation, health and social issues, and entrepreneurship.

References

External links 
 Telemark Research Institute

Research institutes in Norway
Independent research institutes
Social science institutes
1986 establishments in Norway
Research institutes established in 1986